Urtica urentivelutina is a species of the genus Urtica. This species is closely related to U. macbridei, but differs in its much denser and longer indument, especially on the stipules (subglabrous in U. macbridei) and the presence of stinging hairs on the perigon of the female flowers. The leaves are densely pubescent and also irregularly bullate between the veins, which is a character not found in other Peruvian species.

Description
Leaves are opposite, with interpetiolar stipules united in pairs but deeply incised, and completely covered with white simple trichomes appromately  in length. Inflorescences are unisexual, while its fruit is ovate, approximately  x , with a very short apex, largely included in the pubescent perigon.

Distribution
La Libertad, Sánchez Carrión Province. It is found in the remnants of cloud forest vegetation.

References

External links

NGBR Herbarium Specimen

urentivelutina
Flora of Peru
Plants described in 2005